is a 1995 vertically scrolling dōjin shoot 'em up video game developed and originally published by Koichi "Famibe No Yosshin" Yoshida at Comiket for the X68000. Taking place in a ring structure, players take control of the Zanki space fighter craft to fight against an assortment of enemies and bosses.

Cho Ren Sha 68K was first made for the X68000 due to its popularity in the dōjin and freeware development scenes, being influenced by several shoot 'em up games in arcades that also played part with its design process. The game was later ported to Microsoft Windows in 2001, featuring various changes compared to its original release. The title was met with mostly positive reception from reviewers for its presentation, graphics, music and gameplay; criticism was geared towards various design choices but has since gained a cult following, serving as an influence for ZeroRanger (2018).

Gameplay 

Cho Ren Sha 68K is a vertically scrolling shoot 'em up game in which players take control of the Zanki space fighter craft to fight against enemies and bosses on a ring station. The game features a loop system where players start at the beginning of first stage after defeating the last stage boss, with each loop increasing in difficulty and enemies spawning extra bullets when destroyed. The title has multiple adjustable settings on the configuration menu, however more options can be accessed by pressing and holding up at the configuration screen.

A notable aspect of the game is the power-up system: There are three types of items to collect by destroying an enemy carrier, ranging from "Power-up!" (which increases the ship's firepower up to four times), "Bomber" (which grants players another screen-clearing bomb that can be stocked up to five) and "Shield", which gives players an extra hit and if the ship gets hit by an enemy bullet, it emits a small shockwave that clears the screen of both enemy bullets and weaker enemies. When an enemy carrier is destroyed, the power-up icons appear in a ring formation and if the players takes one of the three, the others will disappear but all three power-up items can be obtained by staying on the center of the ring for a period of time. 

Another notable aspect is the scoring system, which is based on how close players destroy enemies. Once the ship is powered up, items will only give points until the ship is destroyed. Depending on the number of lives, bombs and having an active shield, players receive a determined score at the end of each stage. When players reaches one million points, the shield power-up is replaced by a 1UP icon instead. Players have the option of either collecting the 1UP item or risk to stay within the ring formation to grab all three items at the same time, however losing the 1UP item means it will not appear again unless another one million point threshold is reached to get another opportunity.

Development 

Cho Ren Sha 68K was first developed for the X68000 by Koichi "Famibe No Yosshin" Yoshida, who previously worked with Family BASIC to develop two shooter games titled Zacner (1989) and Zacner II (1993), late during the commercial life span of the computer as guide books about its hardware galvanized the platform in both dōjin soft and freeware scenes. Yoshida stated on his personal website detailing development of the project that it was influenced by several shoot 'em up games in arcades such as Batsugun, Tatsujin Ō and Battle Garegga, among others that also played part with its design process. When balancing the player's firepower, the player shot appears four times more powerful  that the initial state, however the damage delivered is "only 1.375 times greater" as quadrupling damage output would break the game if it matched the appearance of the maxed power shot, with Yoshida stating he learned deliberate fine-tuning from Toaplan titles. The fixed width of the player's shot was borrowed from Star Force, however issues arrived when making said shot look more modern before reaching a compromise.

Yoshida wanted to recreate a technique in older shoot 'em up games dubbed "point-blank", where more damage is dealt to enemies upclose as result of various mechanics and wanted a game balance reminiscent of Star Force but said mechanics went against what he planned for Cho Ren Sha 68K, deciding to reduce the size of enemy collision hitboxes constantly that ultimately let to redrawing certain enemies to adjust with their hitboxes. Yoshida also decided to adjust firing accuracy depending on circumstances and cited various titles like Flying Shark, Parodious Da!, and V・V as examples where enemies had low-accuracy aiming. Yoshida wanted to use manual fire mechanics instead of autofire as well, stating that manual fire mechanics were "on the verge of dying out" but decided to implement a semi-autofire feature. Due to hardware limitations with the X68000, multiple sound effects could not be played simultaneously and the main goals Yoshida wanted in his design concept was to evoke a fun sense of destruction and make shooting exciting, prioritizing sound design in a specific order.

Cho Ren Sha 68K was mainly written in C language but Yoshida claimed Assembler language was also used in certain points to increase execution speed. Yoshida also wrote a sprite driver called "XSP", which used a programming technique that increased the number of sprites onscreen, as well as developing a programming trick to overcome the X68000's PCG definition limit. Yoshida released his "XSP" sprite driver publicly at the Kusa no Ne BBS system, a community where game development information was exchanged and he received feedback for the development of his project. The soundtrack was composed by Ruzarin "Loser" Kashiwagi, who worked at a fast pace and wrote songs for the game in days. Kashiwagi had previously written original songs for the X68000 during his high school years before meeting Yoshida via a networking system in Japan and took the task of creating music for the project. When composing for the title, Kashiwagi was influenced by both Battle Garegga and Viewpoint, stating that he made his "own Eurobeat" for the first stage.

Release 

Cho Ren Sha 68K was first released by Famibe No Yosshin as dōjin soft for the X68000 at the 1995 Comiket. On 14 August 1998, an album containing music from the title was published in Japan by Denkai Laboratory, featuring an arranged soundtrack by various composers. 

On 12 September 2001, Cho Ren Sha 68K was later ported to Microsoft Windows as freeware. This version runs at a fixed resolution of 640x480, using 256x256 internally. The original X68000 version ran at 55 frames per second, while the Windows port runs at 60 frames per second instead, increasing the difficulty by 9%. As the original Windows release was intended for Windows 98, playing it on modern hardware exhibits sound issues, which meant that running the game on newer hardware required changing compatibility settings. An updated version of the Windows port was released in August 2005, adding a hard difficulty and fixing various software bugs from the original release. In 2006, the game made a brief appearance in Game Ones French TV documentary Japon: Histoire du Shooting Game. Several other albums with music from the game have also been released through services such as Bandcamp. 

A new updated version of the Windows port was released in May 2017, adding support for Windows 10 while fixing minimal bugs and technical issues. In 2022, Zuiki announced that Cho Ren Sha 68K would be one of the pack-in games for the X68000 Z, a miniaturized version of the X68000. According to Famibe No Yosshin, this release is an unpublished version featuring reworked visuals and sound effects.

Reception and legacy 

Cho Ren Sha 68K has been received with mostly positive reception from reviewers since its release on the X68000 and later on Microsoft Windows. Masaho Saito of Japanese website Windows Forest gave it a positive outlook. Evil Boris of GameHippo.com praised its presentation, graphics and fast-paced gameplay but felt that the sound was above average. Dominik Wetter of Freegame.cz also gave praise to the gameplay but criticized the need of constantly pressing the fire button. Likewise, Sven Ruthner of Retro Gamer CD gave positive remarks to the graphics, Kashiwagi's music, sound design and gameplay mechanics. John Szczepaniak of Retro Gamer regarded the X68000 original as one of the system's "perfect three" games.

David Borrachero and Zed of Spanish magazine RetroManiac noted its visuals as reminiscent of early Toaplan titles, music, frenetism and difficulty level. Remy Bastien of Atomix praised its intense action, sprite work and music but criticized the repeating backgrounds. Nevertheless, Bastien regarded Cho Ren Sha 68K as a cult title. In contrast, Hrej.cz gave the title a more mixed outlook, stating that "Cho Ren Sha 68K brings almost nothing we wouldn't see anywhere else. And that's a really big shame. Lovers of the genre could still be pleased with everything, even if it is only a slightly above-average shoot-up". VentureBeats Stan Evans gave the X68000 original a positive retrospective outlook, stating that the game is fun. Maciej Miszczyk of Hardcore Gaming 101 praised its level design, music and gameplay, stating that it has a place among classics of shoot 'em up genre. In a brief outlook, James Cunningham of Hardcore Gamer stated that "Cho Ren Sha 68K may not be the fanciest shooter out there but it nails that classic feel and is one great encounter after another, so it's well worth taking a trip back to 2001 and checking out one of the greats".

In July 2015, a homebrew conversion of the game for the Atari Falcon was released by Sascha Springer, featuring various changes compared to the original X68000 release. In 2016, a reworked port of the title for the Super Cassette Vision was announced by M2 programmer Takashi "Faw.Labo" Yamashita. System Erasure have cited the game as an influence when developing ZeroRanger. Rival Megagun creator Justin Rempel claimed in a 2018 interview with Japanese website 4Gamer.net that Cho Ren Sha 68K is the shooting game he admires the most.

Notes

References

External links 

 
 Cho Ren Sha 68K at GameFAQs
 Cho Ren Sha 68K at MobyGames

1995 video games
Doujin video games
Freeware games
X68000 games
Vertically scrolling shooters
Video games developed in Japan
Video games scored by Ruzarin Kashiwagi
Windows games
Single-player video games